Dessau-Roßlau is a kreisfreie Stadt (urban district) in the German state of Saxony-Anhalt. It is situated at the confluence of the rivers Elbe and Mulde. The town was formed by merger of the towns of Dessau and Roßlau as part of the 2007 regional bounadry reform of Saxony-Anhalt (Kreisreform Sachsen-Anhalt). The reform involved a reduction in the number of rural districts in Sachsen-Anhalt from 21 to 11, in anticipation of a continued population decline.

Dessau-Roßlau is the third largest town of Saxony-Anhalt by population, after Magdeburg and Halle.

Dessau

Dessau is the largest population centre within Dessau-Roßlau, with approximately 79,000 inhabitants (2021). Most of the town is located on the left bank of the river Mulde, south of its confluence with the river Elbe. Dessau was first mentioned in 1213, and became the capital of a small state (Anhalt-Dessau) in the 14th century. Between 1863 and 1918, it was the capital of Anhalt. Since the second half of the 19th century, Dessau has been an industrial town. With the famous art and architecture school Bauhaus, located in Dessau between 1925 and 1932, and the Dessau-Wörlitz Garden Realm, the town features two UNESCO World Heritage Sites.
The town could be referred to as the one of the birthplaces of the "jet age" because the Junkers factory that designed the Jumo 004 jet engine for the German Me 262 jet fighter (operational from mid-1944) was designed there. As the western shore of the Elbe-Mulde rivers was the stopping point for U.S. troops in World War II, the capture of the town allowed the U.S. Army to evacuate Junkers empoyees  to the west before Russia occupied the area on 1 July 1945. Several engineers of the jet engine development team at Junkers ended up at the Lycoming engine plant in Stratford, Conn., building gas turbine engines for the U.S. Army from 1952 on.

Roßlau

Roßlau has approximately 13,000 inhabitants (2006). It is located on the right bank of the Elbe, near its confluence with the Mulde, about 7 kilometers north of the centre of Dessau. Roßlau was first mentioned in 1215. Before it merged with Dessau, it was part of the district Anhalt-Zerbst.

Governance

Municipal assembly
Seats in the municipal assembly (Stadtrat) as of the May 2019 elections:
Christian Democratic Union (CDU): 12
Alternative for Germany (AfD): 8
The Left: 7
Alliance '90/The Greens: 5
Social Democratic Party of Germany (SPD): 5
Pro Dessau-Roßlau (independent): 4
Forum-Bürgerliste (independent): 4
Free Fraction Dessau-Roßlau (independent): 3
Free Democratic Party (FDP): 2

Mayor
The Lord Mayor (Oberbürgermeister) of Dessau-Roßlau is Robert Reck, elected in June 2021 for a term of seven years.

Twin towns – sister cities

Dessau-Roßlau is twinned with:

 Argenteuil, France (1959)
 Klagenfurt, Austria (1971)
 Ludwigshafen, Germany (1988)
 Ibbenbüren, Germany (1990)
 Gliwice, Poland (1992)
 Vilnius District Municipality, Lithuania (1995) 
 Roudnice nad Labem, Czech Republic (2004)

References

External links

 

 
Duchy of Anhalt
Populated riverside places in Germany
Populated places on the Elbe